The Alliance of the Left Federation (AFG;), formerly the Federation of the Democratic Left (FGD) until 2021, is an alliance created in 2007 of two leftist Moroccan political parties: the Socialist Democratic Vanguard Party and the National Ittihadi Congress. The Unified Socialist Party was a part of the coalition until 2021.

References

2007 establishments in Morocco
Anti-imperialist organizations
Left-wing political party alliances
Political parties established in 2007
Political parties in Morocco
Political party alliances in Africa
Progressive parties
Socialist parties in Morocco